Firlej (plural: Firlejowie) was a Polish szlachta (nobility) family. Magnates in the 15th and 17th century.

History
According to Kasper Niesiecki, Ostafi of Lewart coat of arms came from Franconia, Germany, to Poland, in 1317, to serve Polish king Władysław Łokietek. He was nicknamed Firlej, and the name became his family name. From the 15th to 17th centuries, the Firlej family was a powerful magnate family in the Lesser Poland (Małopolska) region. A branch of the family became a vocal supporter of Protestantism in Poland.

The family became extinct in the 18th century.

Notable members
Piotr Firlej z Dąbrowicy (died 1499), judge and notary of Lublin, married to Jadwiga Osmólska h. Bończa
Mikołaj Firlej (died 1526), Great Hetman of the Crown, married to Anna z Mielca h. Gryf
Piotr Firlej (died 1553), voivode of Ruthenia, married Katarzyna Tęczyńska h. Topór
Jan Firlej (1521-1571), Grand Marshal of the Crown, married Barbara Mniszech h. Mniszech, Zofia Boner h. Boner, Zofia Dzik h. Doliwa
Mikołaj Firlej (died 1601), voivode of Kraków, married Elżbieta Ligęza h. Półkozic and Agnieszka Tęczyńska h. Topór
Mikołaj Firlej (1588–1635), voivode of Sandomierz, married Maria Amalia Mohyła and Regina Oleśnicka h. Dębno
Zbigniew Firlej (1613-1449), starost of Lublin, married Princes Anna Wiśniowiecka h. Korybut and Katarzyna Opalińska h. Łodzia 
Andrzej Firlej (died 1609), castellan of Radom, married Barbara Kozińska and Marianna Leszczyńska h. Wieniawa
Andrzej Firlej (1583-1649), voivode of Sandomierz, married Helena Rohostajska h. Leliwa and HH Przyjemska h. Rawa
Jan Firlej (died 1614), Great Treasurer of the Crown, married Gertruda Opalińska h. Łodzia
Henryk Firlej (1599-1635), Bishop of Poznań
Piotr Firlej (died 1619), voivode of Lublin, married Jadwiga Włodek h. Prawdzic
Stanisław Firlej (died after 1659), castellan of Lublin, married Dorota Leśniowolska h. Roch II 
Jan Firlej, member of the Sejm, married Teresa Warszycka h. Awdaniec
Piotr Firlej, castellan of Wojnice, married Agnieszka Bal z Boisk h. Gozdawa
Mikołaj Firlej (1605-1640), married Zofia Skotnicka h. Bogorya 
Jan Firlej (died 1701), castellan of Sanok, married Weronika Wichrowska z Wichrowa
Henryk Firlej (1574-1626), Archbishop of Gniezno
Mikołaj Firlej (died 1588), voivode of Lublin, married Anna Sierzchowska z Sierzchowy h. Nałęcz
Zofia Firlej, married landlord of Wola Boguszowa Mikołaj Bogusz z Ziemblic h. Półkozic
Katarzyna Firlej, married wojski of Krzemieniec Teodor Sieniuta h. Sieniuta
Andrzej Firlej (c. 1537-1585), Royal Secretary and castellan of Lublin, married Barbara Szreńska h. Dołęga
Dorota Firlej (1563-1591), married voivode of Witebsk and Troki Prince Stefan Zbaraski h. Korybut and Grand Chancellor of the Crown and Hetman Lew Sapieha h. Lis
Anna Firlej (died 1588), married voivode of Brześć Kujawski Andrzej Leszczyński h. Wieniawa, great-grandmother of King Stanisław I Leszczyński
Katarzyna Firlej (died after 1545), married castellan of Chełmno and Sandomierz Stanisław Tarnowski h. Leliwa

Palaces

Bibliography 
 Andrzej Przybyszewski, Firlejowie herbu Lewart, Radomyśl Wielki, 2008, 
 Andrzej Szymanek, Mecenat kulturalny Firlejów ; Firlejowie w tradycji lokalnej Lubelszczyzny, Janowiec : TPJ, 2001,